= Early history of Tajikistan =

This article documents the early history of Tajikistan.

Before the Soviet era, which began in Central Asia in the early 1920s, the area designated today as the Republic of Tajikistan underwent a series of population changes that brought with them political and cultural influences from the Turkic and Mongol peoples of the Eurasian steppe, China, Iran, Russia, and other contiguous regions. The Tajik people came fully under Russian rule after a series of military campaigns that began in the 1860s, at the end of the nineteenth century.

== Ethnic background ==
Iranian peoples, including ancestors of the modern Tajiks, have inhabited Central Asia since at least the earliest recorded history of the region, which began some 2,500 years ago. Contemporary Tajiks are the descendants of ancient Eastern Iranian inhabitants of Central Asia, in particular the Soghdians, Xorasmians and the Bactrians, and possibly other groups, with an admixture of Western Iranian Persians (see Glossary) and non-Iranian peoples. The ethnic contribution of various Turkic and Mongol peoples, who entered Central Asia at later times, has not been determined precisely. However, experts assume that some assimilation must have occurred in both directions.

The origin of the name Tajik has been embroiled in twentieth-century political disputes about whether Turkic or Iranian peoples were the original inhabitants of Central Asia. The explanation most favored by scholars is that the word evolved from the name of a pre-Islamic (before the seventh century A.D.) Arab tribe.

Until the 20th century, people in the region used two types of distinction to identify themselves: way of life—either nomadic or sedentary—and place of residence. By the late nineteenth century, the Tajik and Uzbek peoples, who had lived in proximity for centuries and often used each other's languages, did not perceive themselves as two distinct nationalities. Consequently, such labels were imposed artificially when Central Asia was divided into five Soviet republics in the 1920s.

== See also ==
- Transoxiana
